The Painted Veil may refer to:

 The Painted Veil (novel), by W. Somerset Maugham
 The Painted Veil (1934 film), directed by Ryszard Bolesławski
 The Painted Veil (2006 film), directed by John Curran
 The Painted Veil (soundtrack), composed by Alexandre Desplat

See also 
 The Seventh Sin